Llandel Veguilla Malavé (born; January 14, 1977), known professionally as Yandel, is a Puerto Rican singer and songwriter and the half member of the reggaeton duo Wisin & Yandel. He released his first solo album, Quien Contra Mí, in 2003. His second solo studio album, De Líder a Leyenda, was released in 2013 and was certified Gold (Latin) by the RIAA in 2014.

Early life and family 
Llandel Veguilla Malavé was born on January 14, 1977, in Cayey, Puerto Rico, the son of Julio Veguilla and Lucy Malavé. He has two siblings, a younger brother named Gadiel, who is also a singer and a sister named Linnette. Before he became a singer, Yandel worked as a barber in his hometown.

Music career 
Yandel met Wisin in school. They began performing as a duo in 1998 (Yandel then billing himself as "Llandel") and made their album debut in 2000 with Los Reyes del Nuevo Milenio. They later made the jump to a major label in 2003 with Mi Vida... My Life, their first for Universal subsidiary Fresh Productions. Pa'l Mundo then catapulted them to mainstream success in 2005. Subsequently, Wisin & Yandel established their own label, WY Records and presented an affiliate group, Los Vaqueros. In November 2013, after the duo's Líderes tour, they went on hiatus. Since then he has continued to tour. A third album, Dangerous, was released in November 2015.

Personal life 
In July 2004, Veguilla married his long-time girlfriend Edneris Espada Figueroa.

Tours 
 De Líder a Leyenda VIP Tour (2014)
 Dangerous Tour (2016)

Discography

Studio albums 
 Quien Contra Mí (2003)
 De Líder a Leyenda (2013)
 Dangerous (2015)
 Update (2017)
 The One (2019)
 Quien Contra Mí 2 (2020)
 Resistencia (2023)

EPs 
 Legacy: De Líder a Leyenda Tour (EP) (2014)

Live albums 
 Legacy: De Líder a Leyenda Tour (2015)

Filmography

Awards and nominations

References

External links 

 
 
 

1977 births
Living people
21st-century Puerto Rican male singers
Puerto Rican reggaeton musicians
Spanish-language singers of the United States
People from Cayey, Puerto Rico
Sony Music Latin artists
Latin music songwriters
Latin Grammy Award winners